Faith Minton is an American television and film actress and stuntwoman.

Life
Born in Brooklyn, New York, Minton has a stunt and wrestling background and is probably best known for her role as "Hurricane" Rosy Spelman in the 1979 action comedy film Temporale Rosy opposite Gerard Depardieu, and as "Big Mama", a wrestler in the 1981 film ...All The Marbles, with Peter Falk, Laurene Landon and Vicki Frederick. In 1983, she appeared as the villain's henchwoman in the Italian action comedy Go for It, with David Huddleston and in a supporting role in Smokey and the Bandit Part 3, alongsides Paul Williams, Colleen Camp and Jerry Reed, and opposite Jackie Gleason and Mike Henry. She later guest starred in series such as Fantasy Island, Night Court, Simon & Simon, Knight Rider, V.I.P. and Murder, She Wrote (with William Windom).

Selected filmography
 1978 King of the Gypsies as Gypsy (uncredited)
 1979 Gold of the Amazons as Amazon Warrior
 1979 The Wanderers as The Big Lady
 1979 Temporale Rosy as Rosy "Hurricane Rosy" Spelman / Temporale Rosy
 1980 Cheech & Chong's Next Movie as Lady Bouncer
 1981 ...All The Marbles as "Big Mama"
 1981 All Night Long as Holdup Woman
 1981 Hill Street Blues as Large Hooker
 1981 Charlie Chan and the Curse of the Dragon Queen as Stunt Performer
 1981 Heartbeeps as Stunt Performer
 1983 Go for It as The Vamp / La Fatalona
 1983 Fantasy Island as Mo
 1983 Smokey and the Bandit Part 3 as Tina
 1983 The Man Who Wasn't There as Stunt Performer
 1984 The New Mike Hammer as Bertha
 1984 Night Court as Elsa Dubrinovitch
 1985 Lust in the Dust as Stunt Performer
 1985 Hardcastle and McCormick as Lizzie Butterfly
 1985 Murder, She Wrote as Second Guard
 1985 Knight Rider as Darleen
 1986 The Naked Cage as Sheila
 1986 Misfits of Science as Darleen
 1986 Ruthless People as Stunt Performer
 1986 Simon & Simon as Olga, The Shoplifter
 1987 Jocks as Big Woman In Bar (uncredited)
 1987 Who's That Girl? as Donovan
 1987 Penitentiary III as Female Boxer
 1987 Star Trek: The Next Generation as Klingon Female
 1987 Hooperman as Biker Woman
 1988 License to Drive as Stunt Performer
 1988 Hero and the Terror as Stunt Performer
 1989 Santa Barbara, as Ilsa, she tried to frame Mack for stealing jewels from people at the fitness center.
 1989 Alien Nation as Bouncer
 1991 Switch as Nancy, The Bouncer
 1992 Stay Tuned as Mrs. Gorgon
 1992  Swordsman II as the American dub version of Invisible Asia.
 1995 The Stranger as Kyra, a member of Angel's outlaw biker gang.
 1995 Sudden Death as Carla, one of the terrorists who took Civic Arena during a Stanley Cup Finals game.
 1996 Set It Off as Stunt Performer
 1997 Roseanne as Wrestler
 1997 Unhappily Ever After as Bertha
 1997 Spawn as Stunt Performer
 1998 V.I.P. as Brenda "Big Brenda"
 2001 Bubble Boy as Stunt Performer
 2002 She Spies as Jolene
 2005 Miss Congeniality 2: Armed and Fabulous as Housewife #1
 2006 Sons & Daughters as Biker Chick
 2007 Days of Our Lives as Bertha "Big Bertha" / Tessa / Jail Matron

Stuntwork (extract)
 1997 Batman & Robin
 1986 Ruthless People

References

External links
 
 Faith Minton at NowCasting.com 
 Faith Minton at CineMorgue.Com

American film actresses
Living people
20th-century American actresses
21st-century American actresses
Year of birth missing (living people)